Barbie: Explorer is a Microsoft Windows and PlayStation game featuring Barbie. It was developed by Runecraft, published by Vivendi Universal Interactive Publishing and was released in 2001.

Plot
While working as a reporter, Barbie discovers an ancient mirror in a local museum which is missing 4 pieces, and which when completed will have its power unlocked. She decides to find these pieces by setting off on an adventure around the world to find these 4 treasures. These locations include Tibet, Egypt, Africa (all accessible from the start) and the final unlockable area, Babylon. Each of these locations has three levels, concluding with a boss.

The game ends when the four artifacts are found and Barbie goes back to the museum. She places each artifact in its respective spot on the mirror and it is repaired.

Gameplay
The player takes control of Barbie running, walking  climbing her way through the level. The protagonist has no attack, with the player instead solving puzzles and platforming to get to the level end. The main hazards in the game are animals (such as, camels, elephants, and goats), which do not actively try to attack the player and instead roaming around the environment.  The gameplay was seen as an attempt to imitate the success of Tomb Raider.

Reception

In a review in PSX Nation, J.M. Vargas called the game a "G-rated 'Tomb Raider' clone" without any challenge and an "unbearable" set of controls. They were critical of graphics, especially the animation which they called "atrocious, canned, repetitive and mannequin-like in its awkwardness." Vargas would give the game a 61% overall.

Michael Lafferty, writing for GameZone, was more positive giving it a score of 8/10. He complemented the game by saying that while the arcade style was predictable it, the action is nonstop within levels and it offered "young gamers a Tomb Raider-esque arcade adventure".

References

External links

2001 video games
Explorer
Mattel video games
PlayStation (console) games
Video games based on toys
Video games set in Africa
Video games set in Egypt
Video games set in Iraq
Video games set in Tibet
Video games developed in the United Kingdom
Single-player video games
3D platform games